The Chrysomeloidea are an enormous superfamily of beetles, with tens of thousands of species. The largest families are Cerambycidae, long-horned beetles, with more than 35,000 species, and Chrysomelidae, leaf beetles, with more than 13,000 species.

Overview
The Chrysomeloidea, like all other Phytophaga, typically have the fourth tarsal segment reduced and hidden by the third segment. Several species in these two families are important plant pests. The spotted cucumber beetle is a serious pest of vegetables and is a very common insect on all sorts of flowers. The Colorado potato beetle, Leptinotarsa decemlineata, attacks potatoes and other members of the Solanaceae. The Asian long-horned beetle is a serious pest of trees where it has been introduced. . It seems almost evident that during the Jurassic and the Cretaceous the Chrysomelidae were pollen feeders and then they became external and later on internal feeders on or in leaves, buds, twigs and roots.

Some authorities in the past have suggested removing the Cerambycidae and related families (Disteniidae, Oxypeltidae, and Vesperidae) from Chrysomeloidea to create a separate superfamily "Cerambycoidea" (e.g.,), but in the absence of evidence to support the monophyly of the resulting groups, this proposal has not been widely accepted by the scientific community.

References

Bibliography

External links 

 
Beetle superfamilies